Wolfhart Zimmermann (17 February 1928 – 18 September 2016) was a German theoretical physicist. Zimmermann attained a doctorate in 1950 at Freiburg im Breisgau in topology ("Eine Kohomologietheorie topologischer Räume").

Biography
Zimmermann was born in Freiburg im Breisgau. In the 1950s he lived in Göttingen and was one of the pioneers of the mathematical quantum field theory. He developed the LSZ theory with Kurt Symanzik and Harry Lehmann. From 1962 to 1974 he was a professor at the New York University. From 1974 to 1996 he was a director at the Max Planck Institute for physics in Munich, later becoming the "Director Emeritus".

Since 1977 he was an honorary professor ("Honorarprofessor") at TU Munich. He took a year-long sabbatical stay at the Institute for Advanced Study in Princeton (1957/8 and 1960/1), at the Courant Institute of Mathematical Sciences of New York University, at the University of Chicago and at IHES in Paris. In addition to his work on the LSZ formalism he is also known for the development of Bogolyubov - Parasiuk renormalization schema (also BPHZ Renormalization schema named after Klaus Hepp and Zimmermann). Along with Kenneth G. Wilson he was one of the pioneers in applications of operator product expansion in quantum field theory. With Reinhard Oehme of the Enrico Fermi Institute in Chicago (with whom he already collaborated in Göttingen in the 1950s), he worked on the reduction of coupling parameters with group renormalization methods and introduced superconvergence relations for the propagator (gauge field propagator) into Yang–Mills theory, to establish connections between the borders of high energy (e.g. asymptotic freedom) and low energy (confinement).

In 1991 he received the Max Planck medal.

References

Sources
 Peter Breitenlohner (Ed.) "Quantum Field Theory- Proceedings on the Ringberg Workshop, Tegernsee 1998, On the Occasion of Wolfhart Zimmermann´s 70. Birthday", Lecture Notes in Physics 558, Springer, 1998.
 Zimmermann "Local operator products and renormalization in Quantum Field Theory", Brandeis Summer Institute in Theoretical Physics Lectures 1970, pp. 399–589

External links
 Quantum field theory/BPHZ - Physics wiki - TheTangentBundle

1928 births
2016 deaths
20th-century German physicists
New York University faculty
Scientists from Freiburg im Breisgau
Winners of the Max Planck Medal